Touradji is a surname, and may refer to:

 Paul Touradji, hedge fund founder (Catequil Asset Management,  Touradji Capital Management)
 Pegah Touradji, Assistant Professor at Johns Hopkins Medicine